A.D.H.D is the debut album by English hip hop artist Master Shortie. The album was released on 27 July 2009.

Track listing
"ADHD (Intro)" 
"Bringing It Back"
"Nothing to Be Scared of (Prince Charming)"
"Under the Moon" (featuring Kase)
"Swagger Chick" (featuring Vanessa White)
"Have It Your Way"
"Groupie Love"
"Rope Chain" (featuring Kase)
"Right Time"
"London Town" (co-written by Zakaria Sawalha) 
"Why (Interlude)"
"Dance Like a White Boy"
"Dead End"

Bonus tracks
"Bringing It Back" (Live at RAK)

References

2009 debut albums
Albums produced by Labrinth